UKVisas was the executive arm of the British Government responsible for processing applications for entry clearance to the United Kingdom. It was an executive agency jointly run by the Foreign and Commonwealth Office and the Border and Immigration Agency. On 1 April 2008, UKVisas was absorbed into the newly created UK Border Agency.

See also 
Visa (document)

External links 
UK Border Agency
Visa services homepage at UK Border Agency

Immigration law in the United Kingdom
United Kingdom
Defunct executive agencies of the United Kingdom government
United Kingdom border control
2008 disestablishments in the United Kingdom